The Voznesenovskoye mine is a large mine located in the southern part of Russia in Primorsky Krai in the Khorolsky District. Voznesenovskoye represents one of the largest tantalum reserves in Russia having estimated reserves of 17.2 million tonnes of ore grading 0.012% tantalum.

See also 
 List of mines in Russia

References 

Tantalum mines in Russia